Martim Afonso de Sousa ( – 21 July 1564) was a Portuguese fidalgo, explorer and colonial administrator.

Life
Born in Vila Viçosa, he was commander of the first official Portuguese expedition into mainland of the colony of Brazil. Threatened by the presence of French ships along the coast of Brazil, the Portuguese crown in December 1530 sent a fleet with 400 people led by Martim Afonso de Sousa to establish control and explore. His mission was to place Portuguese markers as far south as the River Plate estuary, but he was shipwrecked there.

Upon return to São Vicente and Santos, in 1532 he led troops guided by the native inhabitants and by earlier Portuguese settlers such as João Ramalho up the Serra do Mar mountains to the area near the future village of São Paulo. On the high plateau, he founded the town of Santo André.  He also established a sugar mill near the coast at São Vicente, with sugarcane brought from the Portuguese Cape Verde islands.  In both activities, Afonso de Sousa established a pattern followed by Portuguese colonizers and Brazilians for long afterward: the "entradas" and "bandeiras" – or explorations and raids into the interior – and the production of sugar along the coast for export.

Sousa was the first Royal Governor of Brazil. He settled in the north-east region of the modern country.

Afonso de Sousa also helped decisively in the acquisition of Diu, in India for Portugal in 1535. From 1542 to 1545 he was governor of Portuguese India. His mandate was especially controversial.

Afonso de Sousa had been raised in the King´s household and was a personal friend since childhood of King John III of Portugal. He sought the title of Earl after his governorship of India, but failed in this. He became a close advisor of Catherine of Austria, widow of John III of Portugal, when she ruled the Realm between 1557 and 1562. He died in Lisbon in 1564.

References

External links 
Biography at UOL Educacao (Portuguese)
Pedro Taques de Almeida Paes Leme História da Capitania de São Paulo "History of the Captaincy of São Paulo"

1500 births
1564 deaths
Portuguese explorers of South America
16th-century explorers
Portuguese colonization of the Americas
Portuguese colonial governors and administrators
People from Vila Viçosa
16th-century Portuguese people
History of São Paulo (state)